Sultan Hassan Al-Hilaaly I, Sri bavana Mahaa radhun was the first sultan to ascend the throne of Maldives from the Hilaalee dynasty by abolishing the dynasty which had ruled the Maldives for more than two centuries. He ascended the throne of The Maldives in 1388.

Sultan Hassan I was the son of Hilaaly Kalo and his wife Golhaavehi kanbulo, likely a Lunar dynasty lady. Golhaavehi may have been misread for Kalavehi as the recorded writings in Arabic were old and faint.  He ruled the country for 10 years until his death in 1398.

1398 deaths
14th-century sultans of the Maldives
Year of birth unknown